The Society of Brethren of the Croatian Dragon (Croatian: Družba "Braća Hrvatskoga Zmaja"; Latin: Societas "Fratres Draconis Croatici") is a Croatian historical and cultural society founded on November 16th, 1905.

History

The Society was formed in times of Croatian territorial and political disunion. Certain autonomy had been bestowed only upon Banic Croatia in co-state with Hungary that was a part of Austro-Hungarian Monarchy. Other regions were out of reach of Croatian banus and parliament.

The Society was founded in politically complex and difficult conditions for the Croats, in times of rightly harbored hopes in resolving Croatian national positions, primarily national unification and integration of the Croatian lands in the pluralistic society shaped by political and national unity. In those times, the opportunities within Austro-Hungarian Monarch, as well as relationships between other European countries, were not encouraging nor affordable. Therefore, the founding of a Croatian cultural society upon the principles of patriotism, honest friendship, brotherly love, respect and unity, provided a major breakthrough in strengthening, developing, modern forming and prosperity of Croatian society and Croatia.

The Society was formed with the purpose to nurture and promote cultural and ethnic values of the Croatian people, strengthening national awareness, shaping modern social content, reviving memories of glorious Croatian historical events and famous Croats, as well as to preserve, renew and promote Croatian cultural and natural heritage. The Society's activity is testified by its work, erected monuments, placed memorial tablets, organized lectures, round tables, symposia and conferences, published books and publications, but also pilgrimages, commemorations, festivities and appropriate activities.

The Society of Brethren of the Croatian Dragon is dedicated to Croatian people with all its activities. There are three different periods in its centennial activities. The first period, since the founding in 1905 until banning of its activities at the beginning of the single-mindedness in 1946, the second period from banning of its activities until Society's renewal in 1990, and the third period from the renewal until the present. During the Independent State of Croatia, the Society was made into a Knight's Order in 1941. The Brethren was restored in 1945 before being banned in Communist Yugoslavia in 1946. It was reestablished in 1990. It is important to point out that the Society, from its founding as a decidedly cultural Croatian brotherhood, shared the destiny of Croatian people and the country. 

The Society of Brethren of the Croatian Dragon  presently acts within the Dragon Headquarters in Zagreb and 19 Dragon Branches in Croatian countries. The membership consists of full members, contributory members and honorary members. There are but a few associations that always had so different, yet socially and professionally confirmed and successful individuals. That is the confirmation of the Society's wealth of knowledge and experience, but also a high awareness of Croatian values and identity, as well as the so important Croatian unity. With special honor and dignity, the Society wisely and patiently reflects and incorporates its activities within the value system of the Croatian state and society, along with their actions that, in essence, bring the truth and a deep devotion to the Croatian homeland and contribute to the patriotic and national values, but also those actions that ae reminiscent of Croatia's suffering and martyrdom. In its essence, the activities that fortify Croatian identity and raise Croatian awareness - the ones which are lively experienced and possess that certain special quality.

The depth of the sense of Society's activities is best displayed though its motto: "Pro aris et focis, Deo propitio!" - "For altars and hearths, with God's grace!". In addition, inside the Dragon Headquarters - in the Dragon and Knight's Hall within the Stone Gate Tower - other thoughts are carved into the beams, the contents and meanings of which are a constant inspiration for the Society. These are the thoughts of Marquis Fran Krsto Frankopan: "He who dies honorably lives forever!", those of poet Ivan Gundulić: "Fair liberty, beloved liberty, liberty sweet avowed, thou art the treasured gift that Good to us endowed!", and those of writer Antun Gustav Matoš: "As long as there is heart, there is Croatia!".

Since its founding, the Society stands for Christian principles in science and art, and also in public and private life. The patron of the Society of Brethren of the Croatian Dragon is St. George Martyr, and Society enjoy a special advocacy of the Holy Virgin Mary of the Stone Gate.

The Society Dragon's salute is: "God grant us happiness! - Long live the Croatian Dragon!".

In 1907, the Society claimed to have found the remains of Petar Zrinski and Fran Krsto Frankopan, and by 1919 those were moved to the Zagreb Cathedral.

Grand Masters
Emilij Laszowski (1906–1935)
Milutin Mayer (1936–1941)
Mladen Deželić (1942–1945)
Antun Bauer (1990–1992)
Đuro Deželić (1992–1993)
Juraj Kolarić (1993–2001)
Matija Salaj (2001–2006)
Dragutin Feletar (2006–2011)
Nevio Šetić (2011–2021)
Mislav Grgić (2021–current)

Members
Zvonimir Šeparović
Milan Bandić

References

External links
Official website

Organizations established in 1905
Cultural organizations based in Croatia
1905 establishments in Austria-Hungary